The 1998 Melbourne Storm season was the first in the club's history. They competed in the NRL's inaugural Premiership and their first season was a major surprise to many, with the new team reaching the top of the ladder in Round 15 and finishing the regular season in 3rd place, only one win behind minor premiers Brisbane. Adopting coach Chris Anderson's new "flat-line" attack, the big Storm forwards laid a platform for their young halves Scott Hill and Brett Kimmorley to wreak havoc on opposing teams. Melbourne's front-rowers Glenn Lazarus, Robbie Kearns and Rodney Howe were all selected to play for New South Wales in the 1998 State of Origin series. A late season injury to captain Lazarus combined with a lack of Finals experience saw the Storm knocked out in the play-offs. The club though had proven they were to be taken seriously, and they had easily produced the best debut season of any new team in the game's history.

Season summary

Pre season – Bookmakers install Melbourne as the $2.50 favourite to win the inaugural NRL wooden spoon. On 7 February wearing white jerseys, Melbourne win their first trial match against Adelaide Rams in Hobart in front of 2,500 fans. Brett Kimmorley scored the first try in club colours.
12 February – At the club's season launch, John Ribot reveals the official uniform of navy blue jerseys with a stylised white and purple chevron design, worn with navy blue shorts and socks.
Round 1 – Melbourne upset Illawarra Steelers to record their inaugural premiership victory, with Scott Hill scoring the club's first tries. Storm are only the fourth non-foundation team to win on debut, and only the second to win away from home.
Round 4 – A record crowd of 20,522 watch unbeaten Melbourne play their first home game at Olympic Park, with chaotic scenes outside the ground, fans are allowed to sit on the running track after half time.
Round 5 – Auckland Warriors inflict the Storm's first defeat of the season.
Round 11 – Melbourne and Illawarra Steelers play out a 14-all draw, with referee Paul Simpkins dropped after a number of errors in the game.
Round 12 – Melbourne record the biggest win by a debut team in premiership history, thrashing Gold Coast Chargers 62–6 in that club's heaviest defeat in their history.
Round 13 – Brett Kimmorley kicks the club's first field goal, in a 25–16 win over Balmain Tigers at Leichhardt Oval.
Round 15 – After defeating North Queensland Cowboys, Melbourne finish the weekend on top of the NRL ladder for the first time.
26 June – Rodney Howe is revealed as the third NRL player in 1998 to test positive to a banned substance.
Round 16 – A controversial try after the final siren to Tony Tatupu hands the Auckland Warriors a 24–21 victory at Olympic Park.
Round 17 – Brisbane Broncos defeat Melbourne 34–16 in front of a crowd of 35,119, the highest attendance to watch Melbourne, and the second highest crowd in the 1998 regular season.
9 July – Rodney Howe is suspended for 22 matches by the ARL drugs tribunal for taking performance-enhancing drugs. Howe was accused of taking the anabolic steroid stanozolol to aid the recovery of a knee injury.
Round 20 – Marcus Bai scores the first hat-trick in club history in a win against 1997 ARL Premiers Newcastle Knights, to cement a top four spot on the NRL ladder.
Round 23 – In diabolical weather conditions, with the Belmore Sports Ground field resembling a swimming pool, Melbourne are almost held scoreless for the first time, with a late try to stand-in captain Tawera Nikau the only points for the Storm.
Round 24 – Melbourne secure a home final by finishing third on the NRL ladder, ending the regular season with a 16–12 win over Canberra Raiders.
27 August – Chris Anderson wins the Dally M Coach of the Year award, with Marcus Bai (wing) and Tawera Nikau (lock) making the Team of the Year.
Preliminary qualifying final – Without captain Glenn Lazarus due to injury, a second half masterclass from Brad Fittler hands Melbourne a 12–26 loss in their NRL finals debut. Before the game, Melbourne announce their first ever jersey sponsorship deal with the Honda logo appearing on player's sleeves.
Elimination quarter final – Melbourne win their first finals game, defeating Canberra Raiders 24–10 to advance to the third week of the five-week finals series.
Elimination semi final – Eventual premiers Brisbane Broncos knock Melbourne out of the 1998 NRL finals, in a game played at the Sydney Football Stadium.
19 September – Storm feeder team Norths Devils win the 1998 Queensland Cup Grand Final, featuring a number of players who played for Melbourne in 1998.

Milestone games

Jerseys
Melbourne's inaugural jerseys were navy blue jerseys with a stylised white and purple chevron design, with gold trim and collars, worn with navy blue shorts and socks. Until late in the season, there were no advertising logos, except that of manufacturer Nike. Unusually, Melbourne carried on the Super League innovation of having player names on the back of jerseys, ostensibly to assist new fans to identify players. The team wore the predominately blue jerseys in every game in 1998, except for the round 15 game against North Queensland Cowboys, when a predominately white jersey was worn with white shorts and socks.

Fixtures

Pre season

Regular season

Source:

Finals

Ladder

1998 Coaching Staff
Head coach: Chris Anderson
Assistant coaches: Greg Brentnall & Steve Anderson
Football Manager: Michael Moore
Head physiotherapist: Tony Ayoub
Head Trainer: Steve Litvensky
Trainer: Aaron Salisbury

1998 squad

List current as of 21 July 2021

Inaugural Team
The first Melbourne Storm team to take to the field in Round 1 of the 1998 NRL season

Representative honours
This table lists all players who have played a representative match in 1998.

Statistics
This table contains playing statistics for all Melbourne Storm players to have played in the 1998 NRL season.

Statistics sources:

Scorers

Most points in a game: 18 points 
 Round 4 – Craig Smith (9 Goals) vs Western Suburbs Magpies

Most tries in a game: 3 
 Round 20 – Marcus Bai vs Newcastle Knights

Winning games

Highest score in a winning game: 62 points
 Round 12 vs Gold Coast Chargers

Lowest score in a winning game: 10 points
 Round 15 vs North Queensland Cowboys

Greatest winning margin: 54 points
 Round 12 vs Gold Coast Chargers

Greatest number of games won consecutively: 4
 Round 1 – Round 4
 Round 12 – Round 15

Losing games

Highest score in a losing game: 21 points
 Round 16 vs Auckland Warriors

Lowest score in a losing game: 4 points
 Round 23 vs Canterbury-Bankstown Bulldogs

Greatest losing margin: 24 points
 Round 19 vs North Sydney Bears
 Elimination Preliminary Final vs Brisbane Broncos

Greatest number of games lost consecutively: 2
 Round 16 – Round 17

Feeder team
Upon entry to the NRL, Melbourne Storm signed an affiliation agreement with Queensland Cup team Norths Devils to act as a feeder club and to provide Melbourne players who were not selected to play first grade a match each weekend. Players would fly to Brisbane each week after training in Melbourne to play Queensland Cup. The arrangement bore immediate results as the side coached by Mark Murray won the minor premiership. Featuring a number of players who had played for Melbourne in 1998, Norths Devils would go on to win the 1998 Queensland Cup Grand Final 35–18 against Wests Panthers.

Awards and honours

Melbourne Storm Awards Night
Melbourne Storm Player of the Year: Robbie Kearns 
Melbourne Storm Rookie of the Year: Ben Roarty
Clubman of the Year: Robbie Kearns
Mick Moore Chairman's Award: Chris Anderson

Dally M Awards Night
Dally M Coach of the Year: Chris Anderson
Dally M Winger of the Year: Marcus Bai
Dally M Lock of the Year: Tawera Nikau

Additional Awards
Rugby League Annual – Players of the Year: Marcus Bai
Rugby League Annual – Team of the Year: Marcus Bai

Notes

References

Melbourne Storm seasons
Melbourne Storm season